Emily K. Abel is a public health and medical historian, author and professor emerita at the UCLA Fielding School of Public Health where she was a Professor of Health Services and Women’s Studies.

Abel earned a B. A. from Swarthmore College, M.A. in history from Columbia University, her Ph.D. in history from the University of London, and her M.P.H. from the UCLA School of Public Health.

Publications
Hearts of Wisdom: American Women Caring for Kin, 1850-1940 (Harvard University Press, 2000), named a Choice Outstanding Academic Book for 2000
Suffering in the Land of Sunshine: A Los Angeles Illness Narrative (Rutgers University Press, 2006) 
Tuberculosis and the Politics of Exclusion: A History of Public Health and Migration to Los Angeles (Rutgers University Press, 2007), won the Viseltear Prize of the Medical Section of the American Public Health Association for an outstanding book in the history of public health
After the Cure: Untold Stories of Breast Cancer Survivors (NYU Press, 2008), co-written with Saskia Subramanian.
Sick and Tired: An Intimate History of Fatigue (University of North Carolina Press, 2021)
Source:

References

Swarthmore College alumni
Columbia Graduate School of Arts and Sciences alumni
UCLA School of Public Health alumni
UCLA School of Public Health faculty
American women historians
Historians from California
American medical historians
Alumni of the University of London
Year of birth missing (living people)
Living people
21st-century American women